A House Through Time is a documentary television series made by Twenty Twenty Television for BBC Two. The first series aired in 2018, a second in 2019, a third in 2020, and a fourth in 2021, with each examining the history of a single residential building in an English city.

The programme is presented by David Olusoga, who studied history at the University of Liverpool in the early 1990s and is Professor of Public History at Manchester University. The series consultant is design historian Professor Deborah Sugg Ryan, of the University of Portsmouth, who also appears in each episode.

Episodes

Series 1 (2018)

The first series features the house at 62 Falkner Street in the Canning area of Liverpool.

Series 2 (2019)

Series two featured 5 Ravensworth Terrace, a Georgian-era terraced house in the Summerhill area of Newcastle-upon-Tyne and began broadcast on BBC Two on 8 April 2019. As a result of research conducted for the programme, a plaque was unveiled there, commemorating a former resident (1841–1857), the naturalist Joshua Alder, on 26 September 2018 by Olusoga and the Lord Mayor of Newcastle, David Down. The house has been Grade II listed since June 1976.

Series 3 (2020)

The third series takes place in Bristol, investigating the history of 10 Guinea Street, whose inhabitants included the satirist John Shebbeare and the future mayor of Bristol Sir John Kerle Haberfield. The house has been Grade II* listed since December 1994.

Series 4 (2021)

The fourth series takes place at 5 Grosvenor Mount, in the Headingley area of Leeds. With the other two houses in its terrace, it has been Grade II listed since August 1976.

See also
 The Secret History of Our Streets

Coordinates

References

External links 
 
 

BBC television documentaries
Television shows about British architecture
2018 British television series debuts
2010s British documentary television series
2020s British documentary television series
English-language television shows
Television series by Warner Bros. Television Studios